The Knesset Committee on Education, Culture and Sport (Hebrew: ועדת החינוך, התרבות והספורט, Vaadat hinuh ha, ha-Tarbut ve-ha-sport) is a Knesset committee which deals with education, culture, sports and arts in Israel.

The committee was established in 1949, during the tenure of the 1st Knesset convocation. The current acting chairman of the committee is member of the Yisrael Beiteinu party Alex Miller.

As a commission for education, the committee deals with all matters related to education: regarding schools, kindergartens, education in specific sectors, private education, teaching materials, the teachers, development and investment in various areas, the education budget, financial support for poor students, the education of students with learning disabilities and the higher education in Israel. The committee also discusses the treatment of various current trends and behaviors among Israeli teens which are widely perceived as negative and how to prevent them.

As a commission for Culture, Sport and Arts, the committee deals with promoting the culture in Israel in three different languages: Hebrew, Arabic and Yiddish.

The committee also deals with all matters related to the various branches of sports in Israel, especially the most popular ones: soccer, basketball, volleyball and swimming.

Chairmen of the Commission

External links 
 Information regarding the current Knesset Committee on Education, Culture and Sport – posted on the Knesset website
 The panel of the Knesset Committee on Education, Culture and Sport through its history – posted on the Knesset website 

Education in Israel
Israeli culture
Sport in Israel
Committees of the Knesset